The Roman Catholic Diocese of Saint-Louis du Sénégal is a diocese located in the city of Saint-Louis in the Ecclesiastical province of Dakar in Senegal.

History
 1763: Established as Apostolic Prefecture of Sénégal from the Diocese of Funchal in Portugal
 January 27, 1936: Renamed as Apostolic Prefecture of Saint-Louis du Sénégal
 February 15, 1966: Promoted as Diocese of Saint-Louis du Sénégal

Special churches
 The cathedral is Cathédrale Saint Louis.

Leadership

 Prefects Apostolic of Sénégal (Roman rite)
 Fr. Jean-Claude Duret, C.S.Sp. (1856 – 1873.08.22), appointed Vicar Apostolic of Senegambia and Titular Bishop of Antigonea
 Bishop François-Marie Duboin, C.S.Sp. (1876.07.20 – 1883.07)
 Bishop François-Xavier Riehl (1883.11.23 – 1886.07.23)
 Bishop Mathurin Picarda (1887.07.14 – 1889.01.22)
 Bishop Joachim-Pierre Buléon, C.S.Sp. (1899.06.06 – 1900.06.13)
 Bishop François-Nicolas-Alphonse Kunemann, C.S.Sp. (1901.02.27 – 1908.03.20)
 Bishop Hyacinthe-Joseph Jalabert, C.S.Sp. (1909.02.13 – 1920.01.12)
 Bishop Louis Le Hunsec, C.S.Sp. (1920.06.26 – 1926.07.26), appointed Superior General of Congregation of the Holy Spirit; future Archbishop
 Prefect Apostolic of Saint-Louis du Sénégal (Roman rite)
 Fr. Joseph Landreau, C.S.Sp. (1955 – 1965)
 Bishops of Saint-Louis du Sénégal (Roman rite)
 Bishop Prosper Dodds, C.S.Sp. (1966.02.15 – 1973.01.12)
 Bishop Pierre Sagna, C.S.Sp. (1974.12.19 – 2003.02.22)
 Bishop Ernest Sambou (since 2003.02.22)

See also
Roman Catholicism in Senegal
 Timeline of Saint-Louis, Senegal

Sources
 GCatholic.org
 Catholic Hierarchy

Saint-Louis du Senegal
Religious organizations established in 1763
Dioceses established in the 18th century
Roman Catholic Ecclesiastical Province of Dakar